The Surrey County Senior League (previously known as the Surrey County Premier League) was a football competition based in Surrey, England.  It operated from 1982 until 2003 when it was absorbed into the Combined Counties League, which had itself been called the Surrey Senior League until 1978.

History
The league was formed in 1982 as the Surrey County Premier League.  Teams which were successful in this league were eligible to step up to the Combined Counties League.  In 2000 the league changed its name to the Surrey County Senior League, but three years later it was absorbed into the Combined Counties League to form a new Division One of that league.

Champions
1982–83 – Farleigh Rovers
1983–84 – Farleigh Rovers
1984–85 – Bedfont
1985–86 – Ditton
1986–87 – Bedfont
1987–88 – Frinton Rovers
1988–89 – Ditton
1989–90 – Frinton Rovers
1990–91 – Ditton
1991–92 – St Andrews
1992–93 – Virginia Water
1993–94 – Netherne
1994–95 – Chobham
1995–96 – Chobham
1996–97 – Virginia Water
1997–98 – Vandyke Colliers United
1998–99 – Chobham & Ottershaw
1999–2000 – Worcester Park
2000–01 – Worcester Park
2001–02 – Seelec Delta
2002–03 – Hersham Royal British Legion

References

 
Football in Surrey
Defunct football leagues in England
1982 establishments in England